The Tracy City Hall and Jail, also known as Old Tracy Jail,  is a commercial structure in Tracy, California. Built in 1899, it was added to the National Register of Historic Places in 1979.

History 

When the city hall and jail was built, Tracy had not yet incorporated as a city and had no organized government of its own, being managed by San Joaquin County officials. San Joaquin County commissioned the building after the previous jail burned down.

The architects' design of the façade of the building was based on San Francesco di Rimini, a fifteenth century church in northern Italy.

In later years, the building housed a local chapter of the Veterans of Foreign Wars. It is now in use as the office for The Grand Foundation.

References

External links 

 The Grand Foundation, official site

National Register of Historic Places in San Joaquin County, California
Government buildings completed in 1899